The 1923–24 New York S.C. season was the third and last season for the club in the American Soccer League. At the end of February 1924, Adolph Buslik sold the National Giants F.C. franchise to Maurice Vandeweghe. Prior to the purchase, Vandeweghe had been part-owner and manager of New York S.C. with Hugh Magee. The club finished the season in 3rd place.

In the off-season, the franchise was sold to the Indiana Flooring Company who had fielded a club in the 1923–24 season of the First Division of the New York State Association Football League and won that league.

American Soccer League

Pld = Matches played; W = Matches won; D = Matches drawn; L = Matches lost; GF = Goals for; GA = Goals against; Pts = Points

National Challenge Cup

American Football Association Cup

Southern New York State Football Association Cup

Exhibitions

Notes and references
Bibliography

Footnotes

New York S.C.
American Soccer League (1921–1933) seasons
New York S.C.